The 2008–09 season is the Central Coast Mariners' first season of soccer in Australia's new women's league, the W-League.

Season

Fixtures

Standings

Players

Leading scorers

The leading goal scores from the regular season.

Squad statistics
Last updated 29 December 2008

Records
 First game = 2-0 loss away V Melbourne Victory W-League
 Largest win = 6-0 win away V Adelaide United W-League
 Largest loss = 5-0 loss home V Queensland Roar W-League

References

Central Coast Mariners FC (A-League Women) seasons
Central Coast Mariners W-League